Houwhoek Pass is a pass on the N2 national road between Grabouw and Botrivier in the Western Cape province of South Africa.  The pass is a dual carriageway and the summit is at 340m above sea level.  The Overberg branch line as well as the gravel road of the old Houwhoek Pass are nearby, following a similar route but closer to the Jakkals River.  The Houw Hoek Hotel and Houw Hoek Farm Stall are close to the summit of the pass.

References

Mountain passes of the Western Cape
N2 road (South Africa)
Elgin, Western Cape